Mobile Communications Company of Iran (Šerkat-e Ertebâtât-e Sayyâr-e Irân), commonly abbreviated as MCI and also known under its brand name Hamrah-e Avval (the first companion), is the first and largest mobile operator in Iran. Hamrahe Aval's service is available in 1,239 cities and over 70,000 kilometers of highway in Iran is sheet. It provides roaming services via 271 partner operators in more than 112 countries.

In December 2010, 5.5% of the MCI shares were offered on the Iranian over-the-counter market (Farabourse), at a value of $396 million, which was the largest IPO-to-date in the Iranian OTC equity market.

In August 2013, the company moved from the OTC to the Tehran Stock Exchange

Currently, 90% of MCI's shares are owned by the Telecommunication Company of Iran, and the remaining 10% of shares are public at the Tehran Stock Exchange.

In 2015, MCI launched 3G, and 4G technologies by a new brand name as Notrino.

History

By the end of March 2004, the number of the subscribers grew up to 3,450,000 subscribers; the number of subscribers is more than 43 million today (the number of subscribers of Hamrah-e-Avval). In addition, Hamrah-e Avval has also provided proper coverage over more than 52,000 km of countrywide road networks and 1120 cities throughout the country.
In line with 3rd Socio-Economic and Cultural Development of the Islamic Republic of Iran, a number of 4,590,000 new subscriptions were added to the network which in turn shows 934.8% increase and the penetration rate was increased from 0.78% at the beginning of the 3rd Socio-Economic and Cultural Development of the Islamic Republic of Iran to 7.5% by the end of the Plan. By the end of the 3rd Socio-Economic and Cultural Development of the Islamic Republic of Iran, the tree provinces with the highest penetration rate were Tehran, Isfahan and Yazd respectively; from the point of view of performance, Tehran, Isfahan and Yazd had also the highest performance.

The special services provided to the subscribers are call transfer, call waiting, caller ID, FDN services, call restriction, fax connection, data services, SMS and VMS systems, and international roaming.

Evolution of the mobile telephone in the world
 
As a personal communication means, the telephone network has the highest application in the world.  The possibility of provision of mobile phone has emerged in 1960 in Scandinavian states (Sweden, Norway, Denmark and Finland) in 1960s. By the end of the decade the first point to point telephone was used and this was a turning point in telecommunication industry and thereby one of mankind's dreams was realized.
The technology was introduced to the market by Scandinavian states to the market by use of analog technology. The first mobile telephone network (Nordic Mobile Telephone – NMT) was introduced by these states. In early 1980s, the use of digital telephone in automobile was put into the agenda.

In 1977, Canada has designed the first public information network and put into operation. The public international information systems were realized by use of computer, satellite and microwave transmitter and receivers.

The USA introduced the Nordic Mobile Telephone (NMT) to the market in 1983. Japan was the third country in the work, which introduced its mobile network that in turn was a mixture of Scandinavian and American systems, named HCMS; then developed NTT system with network connection possibility. In 1985, England introduced TACS system and thereby joined to the countries with mobile communication network. Thereafter, a NMT system with 450 mega Hz frequency was employed by Denmark, Norway, Sweden and Finland and they joined to the countries with mobile telephone network. The Netherlands, Luxemburg and Belgium accepted it a little changes and Cyprus jointed to the network in 1989. In the same year Canada accepted American network of AMPS.

In the same year, European Telecommunication Standard Institute (ETSI), representing 17 European states, agreed to design and innovate a common standard for launching a digital mobile telephone network. The standard named GSM and currently has three parts with similar performance but different frequencies.

In 1986 the international information network, Internet, was launched as the most extensive international information system and in 1987 narrow bandwidth was selected; in the same year, 13 European states entered into memorandum of understanding on due implementation of GSM specifications by all the MOU parties. These 13 countries have also agreed to make their borders open to each other for commercial activities in this field. By extension of information systems along with the telephone networks, the need to their integration became an essential in 1980s and finally led the countries to ISDN network establishment. ISDN was the result of the investigations and research of the scientists in connection with digital technology in 1960s. In digital system the relation between the parts, devices and equipment is mainly in the form of digits and the mechanical work is very low and, consequently, the noise is very low.
Integrated System of Digital Network (ISDN) was submitted to the EU in the middle of 1980s for review. The network, which has been put into operation in some states, is a kind of switch-based closed network, which the voice and video services are provided by use of switching equipment. The system has high performance and flexibility, especially in high transmission of high volume data and huge number of demands for transmission of telephone messages, in central computers, computer terminals and other services which requires high level of flexibility and efficiency and low cost.

Among the technologies, which put into service in the recent decade, is video conference and multimedia networks introduced in 1970s by ATST Company in New York. In this network, using TDM switch technology the simultaneous with transmission of the voice on a pair of wires the video and data is transmitted as well by use of remote control possibility.
 
The First Generation of Mobile Telephone was put into operation in 1979 for commercial use in the United States and Japan.  These telephones, which use the cell telecommunication system, evolved into G2 and digital system. The increase in the number of subscribers and lower possibility of call hearing in G2 finally led to development of G3 which is the estimated 2000 horizon of ITU in the 21st century.

IMT 2000 is an advanced mobile communication which is used for provision of telecommunication services in global scale disregarding the network and terminal location. By integration of land and satellite mobile network different wireless access will be provided including the exiting services of the fixed telephone systems and other services provided for the mobile telephone subscribers. IMT-2000 will make possible the use of all mobile terminals in connection with land or satellite networks and also terminals designed for use in fixed or mobile applications.

History of mobile telephone in Iran and the existing situation

Council of Ministers, in its meeting on August 4, 2004, on the basis of Ministry of Communications and IT's proposal No. 100/13897 of August 4, 2004 and on the strength of Articles (2) and (4) of the 3rd Socio-Economic and Cultural Development of the Islamic Republic of Iran, approved in 2000 as well as approval of the Higher Administrative Council's approval under No. 1901/76016 of July 15, 2003 in line with implementation of Article (1) of the said Law, has approved the reorganization of Distance Measurement Center in the form of Mobile Communication Company of Iran.
 
The exploitation of cell phone system was commenced for the first time in Iran in 1994 by use of 176 transmitters and receiver installed in 24 stations and with 9200 cell phone numbers. The high demand of the subscribers of this phenomenon forced ITC to extend the coverage and facilities and, by March 2006, the number of cell phone subscribers increased to 15907 and, in addition to Tehran, coverage provided for some cities including Mashhad, Ahwaz, Tabriz, Isfahan and Shiraz.

The extension trend of the system continued in the following years and, in addition to the above-named cities, the coverage provided for a number of 28 new cities. Now, the number of subscribers had been increased form 59,967 in 1994 to 3,449,878 in March 2004.
In line with this extension trend and following the policies of the government regarding provision of enjoyment for all classes of the community, including those living in small cities like large cities, the number of cities under network coverage increased from 134 in March 1997 to 667 cities in March 2004.
 
Presently, the number of mobile telephone network subscribers has increased to more than 43 million more than 1120 cities and the coverage has been provided for more than 47,000 km road network throughout the country.

The penetration coefficient of the subscribers is about 55% of the community and roaming services have been provided in more than 110 countries.

See also
Mobile phone market in Iran

External links
Official website

References

Mobile phone companies of Iran
Companies listed on the Tehran Stock Exchange
Iranian brands
Iranian companies established in 1992
Telecommunications companies established in 1992